Cuyahoga Valley may refer to:

 Cuyahoga Valley, a neighborhood in the city of Cleveland, Ohio
 Cuyahoga Valley National Park, an American national park in Northeast Ohio